Village Suisse ONG is a Swiss-based NGO, accredited to the UN ECOSOC, with a stated mandate to help children in developing countries, to provide computers to persons in developing countries and to provide social integration for persons in Switzerland.

Village Suisse ONG and the Church of Scientology 
Village Suisse ONG is associated with several events of the  Church of Scientology

The relationship of Village Suisse ONG to the Church of Scientology caused media controversy in 2009, when the UN Office at Geneva (UNOG) refused entrance of the Scientology group "Youth for Understanding" to the UN premises, for a meeting which had been planned and organized by Village Suisse ONG.

In 2016, Village Suisse ONG was again noted by the Tribune de Geneve for holding a conference for a "Day of the NGOs", sponsored by the Church of Scientology.  The news-article claimed that documentation distributed at the meeting in the UN Palais des Nations was probably edited by the Church of Scientology.

See also
Youth for Human Rights International

References

Scientology